Gilmour Space Technologies (also known as Gilmour Space) is a venture-funded Australian space company headquartered in Queensland, Australia that is developing hybrid-engine rockets and associated technology to support the development of a low-cost space launch vehicle.

Its stated mission is to provide affordable space launch services to the world's fast-growing small satellite industry. The maiden launch of its first commercial orbital vehicle, called Eris, is planned for April 2023 from Bowen Orbital Spaceport in Abbot Point, Bowen. Eventually, the company is also looking to provide low-cost space access for human spaceflight and exploration.

Founding
Gilmour Space was founded in 2012 in Singapore by former banker, Adam Gilmour. Gilmour graduated from Monash University with Bachelor's Degree in Banking and Finance. In 2013, the Australian CEO & Founder set up similar operations in Queensland, Australia with his brother James Gilmour.

The company's first project in 2013 was to design and manufacture high-fidelity spaceflight simulators and replicas for a number of space-related exhibits, and education centres, including Spaceflight Academy Gold Coast, Australia's first astronaut training centre. It began its rocket development program in 2015; and within 18 months, successfully launched Australia and Singapore's first privately developed hybrid test rocket using proprietary 3D printed fuel.

Gilmour Space's Series A and B investors include Blackbird Ventures, Main Sequence Ventures and 500 Startups. Their Advisors include ex-NASA administrators, Professor Dava Newman and Colonel (Retired) Pamela Melroy.

Launch vehicles

RASTA 
RASTA (Reusable Ascent SeparaTion Article) was a sub-orbital sounding rocket launched by Gilmour Space on 22 July 2016, the vehicle was propelled by a proprietary hybrid rocket engine. RASTA performed nominally during the test flight and reached an apogee of 5 km. RASTA was the first launch vehicle flown by Gilmour Space and was the world's first demonstration of a rocket launch using 3D printed fuel, This was not the first flight of a hybrid rocket engine from Australia, as Hybrid rockets had been flown as early as 1997 in Australia by members of the Tripoli Rocketry Association Australia (TRAAU) and the New South Wales Rocketry Association (NSWRA).

RASTA was also referred to as RASTA MK2 or RASTA 2 internally for unknown reasons. A possible explanation of this would be because the Head of Propulsion at the time, Jamie Anderson, previously worked on and flew a separate sounding rocket named RASTA (Recovery And Separation systems Test Article) at an organisation called Academic Space Launch Initiative or ASLI in 2012.

One Vision 
One Vision was a sub-orbital sounding rocket designed to test Gilmour Space's new mobile launch platform and their hybrid rocket engines. On 29 July 2019, One Vision was prepared and fuelled for its maiden test flight, however, during the countdown to launch, the vehicle suffered an anomaly, resulting in a premature end to the mission. The anomaly was caused by a pressure regulator in the oxidiser tank that had failed to maintain required pressure, causing damage to the tank. According to the company, after a detailed investigation into the anomaly, 15 key recommendations were implemented into the design of Eris.

Eris 
Eris is a three-stage small-lift launch vehicle designed to launch up to 305 kg of payload to low Earth orbit. The vehicle is known to have four of Gilmour Space's hybrid rocket motors to propel the first stage. Eris is expected to make its first commercial launch in April 2023. Eris has a height of 25m and a diameter of 2m for the first stage, which then tapers at the interstage of the first and second stage to 1.5m. The payload fairing has two diameter configurations, 1.5m and 1.2m. Eris will launch from Bowen Orbital Spaceport in Abbot Point, Bowen. Eris has also been referred to in the past as Eris-S and Eris-100.

Eris-400/Eris-L 
Eris-400/Eris-L was a planned clustered engine variant of Eris designed to take up to 450 kg to low Earth orbit. Little information has been disclosed about this vehicle and it is unknown if it is still slated.

Eris Block 2 
Eris Block 2 is an upgraded variant of Eris designed to lift 1,000 kg to low Earth orbit. It is expected to begin commercial service in 2024.

Technology

Engine Development
Testing of Gilmour Space's hybrid rocket motors began in February 2016 with a seven-second test of the engine later used on RASTA. Two more static fires of RASTA's engine were conducted before its suborbital flight.

Gilmour Space became the first private rocket company in Australia to launch a proprietary hybrid rocket in June 2016 with RASTA.

Gilmour Space conducted a 5 second test of their Catalyst mono-propellent thruster in July 2016. It is unclear what the purpose of this thruster is for, a possible purpose would be on the 1U Cubesat and the upper stage(s) of Eris.

The company designed and built its own mobile rocket launch platform in 2018-19 (as there were no commercial Australian launch sites at the time), the move launcher platform was successfully tested and proven with the launch attempt of One Vision.

The company has since focused its attention on developing Eris, and it is actively seeking partners, such as Australia's Defence Science and Technology group, to test and manufacture its orbital launch vehicles in Australia.

Engine Static Fires 
Gilmour Space Technologies has conducted multiple hybrid engine static test firings since making their first static firing of the RASTA sounding rocket hybrid rocket motor.

Deep Space & Exploration Research
Gilmour Space has also supported a number of proof-of-concept technology projects related to the development of a long-term space habitat. An example is the M.A.R.S (Mars Aqua Retrieval System)  rover project, a collaborative educational project at SUTD which received an award at the 2016 ASME international student competition. and was featured in National Geographic's Exploring Mars exhibit in Singapore.

The company is also working on an in-space cubesat propulsion system, which could potentially be used to send a 1U cubesat from Earth's orbit to that of other moons or planets in the solar system.

In February 2018, it signed a reimbursable Space Act Agreement with NASA to collaborate on various research, technology development and educational initiatives, including the testing of its MARS rover at Kennedy Space Center.

Spaceflight Simulators
The company has earlier developed a number of unique high-fidelity spaceflight simulators and replicas, including a 6 degree-of-freedom space plane simulator, space capsule simulator, fighter cockpit trainers, low gravity climb, mission control simulators, and others.

In February 2017, the Design Business Chamber of Singapore awarded Gilmour Space with the Singapore Good Design Mark (SG Mark 2017) for excellence in design and quality of its simulators.

Funding and Awards
In the fourth quarter of 2016, its then-Singapore business was awarded a grant by the country's National Additive Manufacturing Innovation Cluster (NAMIC) to develop aerospace-related additive manufacturing capabilities with the Singapore University of Technology and Design (SUTD).

In May 2017, Gilmour Space secured AUD 5 million in Series A round funding to develop and launch a low-cost launch vehicle for the small payload market. The lead investor was Australian venture capital firm Blackbird Ventures, with co-investors including global venture capital firm 500 Startups and other private investors.

The company has also been awarded other grants by Advance Queensland in Australia, and the Singapore Economic Development Board.

In June 2018, it received the Australian Trade & Investment Commission Innovation Award by the Australian Chamber of Commerce, Singapore "for the individual or organisation that has demonstrated innovation through bringing progressive and new ideas to business in priority sectors".

In September 2018, the company became of the first Australian space companies to raise a Series-B investment round of US$14 million, led by CSIRO venture capital arm, Main Sequence Ventures.

In June 2019, Gilmour Space CEO Adam Gilmour was named the Advance Award winner in Advanced Manufacturing. The Advance Awards showcases the work of Australian citizens or residents who have made a significant global contribution overseas across selected industries.

In November 2019, Adam was made a member of the Australian Space Agency's Space Industry Leaders Forum, which keeps the Agency informed on industry relevant issues and provides a coordination point for the civil space sector.

In December 2019, Gilmour Space signed a statement of strategic intent with the Australian Space Agency as a demonstration of its commitment to launch Australia to space.

In the first quarter 2020, Gilmour Space was awarded a $3 million Cooperative Research Centres Projects (CRC-P) and a $0.25 million Advanced Manufacturing Growth Center (AMGC) grant, to work with partners to manufacture new composite parts for rockets.

In November 2020, Gilmour Space was named 'Launch Business of the Year' and 'Business of the Year - SME' at the inaugural 2020 Space Industry Awards.

In April 2021, Gilmour Space signed a Memorandum of Understanding with SpaceLink, an American company building an “information superhighway for the space economy” using communications technology between low-orbit satellites and the ground.

In May 2021, it was announced that an environmental and technical study conducted by the Queensland government for Abbot Point, Bowen was passed which gave the green light for Gilmour Space to construct a launch facility and conduct spaceflight activities at Abbot Point.

In November 2021, Gilmour Space was named one of the 'World's Best Employers in the Space Industry' by Everything Space, a recruitment platform specializing in the space industry.

References

Space technology
Private spaceflight companies
Aerospace companies of Australia
Companies based on the Gold Coast, Queensland